John Lyon School (formerly The Lower School of John Lyon) is an academically selective private boys and girls' day school in Harrow on the Hill, Greater London, England. The school was founded in 1876, by the Governors of Harrow School for the education of local boys, in keeping with the belated wishes of John Lyon, Harrow School's founder. The school is a successor to the 'English Form' established in 1853, to educate local scholars. The John Lyon School still maintains its historic ties with Harrow School, and the two schools are closely partnered. The school is a member of the Headmasters' and Headmistresses' Conference (HMC).

Structure and curriculum
The governing body of Harrow School retains some control of the John Lyon School; most responsibilities, however, are delegated to a John Lyon board of governors (officially styled Committee of Management). A number of Harrow governors serve on this committee, alongside co-opted governors. Unlike many previous governing bodies in British schools, there is no academic staff involvement in overall school government.

The John Lyon School is divided into three age sections:

Oldfield  – Years 7 and 8
Upper School – Years 9, 10 and 11
Sixth Form  – Lower Sixth and Upper Sixth

Heads 

J.E. Williams - September 1879 - July 1898
E. Young - September 1898 - July 1910
E.H. Butt - December 1910 - April 1926
O.A. Le Beau - April 1926 - July 1951
R.F. Boyd Campbell - September 1951 - July 1968
G.V. Surtees - September 1968 - July 1983
D. Dixon - September 1983 - July 1986
Reverend T.J. Wright - September 1986 - July 2001
Dr C. Ray - September 2001 - August 2004
D.A. Rimmer (Acting Head) - September 2004 - Dec 2004
K.J. Riley - January 2005 - August 2009
Miss K.E. Haynes - August 2009 - to present

Notable alumni 

Larry Barker, screenwriter
Francis Bennion, jurist
Michael Bogdanov (d.2017), theatre director
Andrew deMello, scientist and academic
Andrew Carwood, conductor and singer, Director of Music, St. Paul's Cathedral, London 
Alfred Dunhill (d.1959), tobacconist and inventor, progenitor of the Dunhill luxury goods company
David Fell, cricketer
Alastair Fraser, cricketer and a director of the Middlesex Cricket Board
David Gavurin, musician
Gary Gibbon, political editor at Channel 4
Ben Gill, former footballer
Michael Gold, TV documentary producer
Roger Griffin, professor of modern history and political theorist at Oxford Brookes University
Liam Halligan, broadcaster and economist
Johann Hari, journalist
Kenneth Hudson, industrial archeologist and museologist
Anthony Jeffrey, former Arsenal FC Academy footballer
Vladimir V. Kara-Murza, Russian politician and journalist
Michael McCarthy, Director of Music, U.S National Cathedral, Washington, USA
Inder Manocha, comedian
Sir Peter Marychurch KCMG, former Director of the British signals intelligence agency, GCHQ
Alastair Miles, operatic and concert bass
Brian Pearce, (d.2008), historian
Stephen Pollard, journalist and Editor of The Jewish Chronicle newspaper
David Punter, academic and writer
Julian Rhind-Tutt, actor
Gordon Douglas Rowley, (d. 2019) botanist and writer
Raymond Sawkins, novelist, writing as Colin Forbes
Michael Shersby (d.1997), former Conservative MP for Uxbridge
Victor Silvester (d.1978), former band leader
Kabir Toor, former Middlesex cricketer 
Michael Turner, artist
Michael Richter, Head of Trading Analytics at IHS Markit
Timothy West, actor
Paul Wilkinson (d.2011), academic

Notable staff and governors
Ian Blanchett (former cricket coach), Middlesex cricketer
Lord Lexden (former governor), official historian of the Conservative Party
Angus Fraser (Governor / cricket coach), England International cricketer
Owain Arwel Hughes CBE (former Chair of Governors), conductor
Albert Alan Owen (former Music teacher), composer
Chris Peploe (cricket coach), Middlesex cricketer
George Weedon (former PE teacher), Olympic gymnast 
Ian Whybrow (former Head of English), children's author
David Oldroyd (1936-2014) (former science teacher 1960s), latterly professor (History and Philosophy of Science) at the University of New South Wales.

The Old Lyonian Association represents the school's alumni (Old Lyonians).

References

External links
School Website
Profile on the ISC website

Educational institutions established in 1876
Private schools in the London Borough of Harrow
Private boys' schools in London
Member schools of the Headmasters' and Headmistresses' Conference
Harrow School
1876 establishments in England